Pascula ochrostoma is a species of sea snail, a marine gastropod mollusk in the family Muricidae, the murex snails or rock snails.

Description
The shell size varies between 11 mm and 35 mm

Distribution
This species is distributed in the Red Sea and in the Indian Ocean along Aldabra, Chagos, Madagascar, the Mascarene Basin, the Seychelles and Tanzania. It is also known from the Western Pacific Ocean, the Philippines and North and Western Australia.

References
Citations

Bibliography
 Taylor, J.D. & M.S. Lewis (1970). The flora, fauna and sediments of the marine grass beds of Mahe, Seychelles. J. nat. Hist. 4: 199–220.
 Vine, P. (1986). Red Sea Invertebrates. Immel Publishing, London. 224 pp
 Dautzenberg, Ph. (1929). Mollusques testacés marins de Madagascar. Faune des Colonies Francaises, Tome III

External links
 

Ergalataxinae
Gastropods described in 1832